The Church of St. Pierre du Queyroix (Limousin ) is one of the main churches of Limoges, Haute-Vienne, France. It is located in the neighborhood Le Château in the greater city centre of Limoges.

Description
Although the church was built in the Gothic style in the 13th and 16th centuries, it features elements from the Romanesque period. In the 19th century, it was added Gothic-inspired elements, such as gables, balustrades and slate-covered pavilion roofs.

The church has several altarpieces from the Jesuit Chapel which is now located in the enclosure of Gay-Lussac High School.

The church's crypt hosts an ossuary.

The church building became a Class Historic Monument in 1909.

The church has a stained glass window made by Jean Pénicaud in the 16th century. It represents the Coronation of Mary. Another stained glass made by Gustave Doré in 1875 shows the Miraculous catch of fish.

References

13th-century Roman Catholic church buildings in France
16th-century Roman Catholic church buildings in France
Churches in Haute-Vienne
Gothic architecture in France
Romanesque architecture in France
Limoges
Monuments historiques of Nouvelle-Aquitaine
13th-century establishments in France